Lawrence Rush "Rick" Atkinson IV (born November 15, 1952) is an American author, most recently of The British Are Coming: The War for America, Lexington to Princeton, 1775–1777, the first volume in the Revolution Trilogy. He has won Pulitzer Prizes in history and journalism.

After working as a newspaper reporter, editor, and foreign correspondent for The Washington Post, Atkinson turned to writing military history. His seven books include narrative accounts of five different American wars.

His Liberation Trilogy, a history of the American role in the liberation of Europe in World War II, concluded with the publication of The Guns at Last Light in May 2013. In 2010, he received the $100,000 Pritzker Military Library Literature Award for Lifetime Achievement in Military Writing. In 2019, Atkinson was named a Vincent J. Dooley Distinguished Fellow by the Georgia Historical Society, an honor that recognizes national leaders in the field of history as both writers and educators whose research has enhanced or changed the way the public understands the past.

Life and career
Atkinson was born in Munich to Margaret (née Howe) and Larry Atkinson, who was a U.S. Army officer. Turning down an appointment to West Point, he instead attended East Carolina University on a full scholarship, graduating with a bachelor of arts degree in English in 1974. He received a master of arts degree in English language and literature from the University of Chicago in 1975.

While visiting his parents for Christmas at Fort Riley, Kansas, in 1975, Atkinson found a job as a newspaper reporter for The Morning Sun in Pittsburg, Kansas, covering crime, local government, and other topics in southeast Kansas, an area known as "the Little Balkans" for its ethnic diversity and fractious politics. In April 1977, he joined the staff of The Kansas City Times, working nights in suburban Johnson County, Kansas before moving to the city desk and eventually serving as a national reporter; in 1981, he joined the newspaper's bureau in Washington, D.C. He won the Pulitzer Prize for national reporting in 1982 for a "body of work" that included a series about the West Point class of 1966, which lost more men in Vietnam than any other Military Academy class. He also contributed to the newspaper's coverage of the Hyatt Regency walkway collapse in Kansas City, Missouri, for which the paper's staff in 1982 was awarded a Pulitzer Prize for local spot news reporting.

In November 1983, Atkinson was hired as a reporter on the national staff of The Washington Post. He wrote about defense issues, the 1984 presidential election. He covered Rep. Geraldine Ferraro, the first woman vice-presidential candidate for a major party, and national topics. In 1985, he became deputy national editor, overseeing coverage of defense, diplomacy, and intelligence. In 1988, he returned to reporting as a member of the Post investigative staff, writing about public housing in the District of Columbia and the secret history of Project Senior C.J., which became the B-2 stealth bomber. In 1991, he was the newspaper's lead writer during the Persian Gulf War. Two years later he joined the foreign staff as bureau chief in Berlin, covering Germany and NATO and spending time in Somalia and Bosnia. He returned from Europe in 1996 to become assistant managing editor for investigations; in that role, he headed a seven-member team that for more than a year scrutinized shootings by the District of Columbia police department, resulting in "Deadly Force," a series for which the Post was awarded the Pulitzer Prize for Public Service.

Atkinson left the newspaper world in 1999 to write about World War II, an interest that began with his birth in Germany and was rekindled during his three-year tour in Berlin. He twice rejoined the Post, first in 2003 when for two months he accompanied General David Petraeus and the 101st Airborne Division during the invasion of Iraq, and again in 2007 when he made trips to Iraq and Afghanistan while writing "Left of Boom", an investigative series about roadside bombs in modern warfare, which won the Gerald R. Ford Award for Distinguished Reporting on National Defense. He held the Omar N. Bradley Chair of Strategic Leadership at the United States Army War College and Dickinson College in 2004–2005, and remains an adjunct faculty member at the war college.

Atkinson is a presidential counselor at the National World War II Museum in New Orleans, a member of the Society of American Historians, and an inductee in the Academy of Achievement, for which he also serves as a board member. He serves on the governing commission of the National Portrait Gallery. Atkinson is married to the former Jane Ann Chestnut of Lawrence, Kansas, a researcher and clinician at the National Institutes of Health. They have two grown children.

Works
Atkinson's first book, written while on leave from the Post, was The Long Gray Line: The American Journey of West Point's Class of 1966. A 1989 review in Time magazine called it "brilliant history", and Business Week reviewer Dave Griffiths called it "the best book out of Vietnam to date". Author James Salter, reviewing the book for The Washington Post Book World, wrote, "Enormously rich in detail and written with a novelist's brilliance, the pages literally hurry before one."

In 1993, Atkinson wrote Crusade: The Untold Story of the Persian Gulf War. In a review, The Wall Street Journal wrote, "No one could have been better prepared to write a book on Desert Storm, and Atkinson's Crusade does full justice to the opportunity."

Publication of The Liberation Trilogy began in 2002 with An Army at Dawn: The War in North Africa, 1942–1943, acclaimed by The Wall Street Journal as "the best World War II battle narrative since Cornelius Ryan's classics, The Longest Day and A Bridge Too Far." While with the 101st Airborne Division south of Baghdad in April 2003, Atkinson learned that the book had been awarded the Pulitzer Prize for history. The trilogy's second volume, The Day of Battle: The War in Sicily and Italy, 1943–1944, published in 2007, drew praise from The New York Times as "a triumph of narrative history, elegantly written...and rooted in the sight and sounds of battle." Volume three, The Guns at Last Light: The War in Western Europe, 1944–1945, was published by Henry Holt and Co. in May 2013, and was ranked #1 on the New York Times Hardcover Nonfiction and Combined Print & E-Book Nonfiction bestseller lists. A review in The New York Times called the book "a tapestry of fabulous richness and complexity...Atkinson is a master of what might be called 'pointillism history,' assembling the small dots of pure color into a vivid, tumbling narrative... The Liberation Trilogy is a monument achievement."</ref>

As a result of his time with Gen. Petraeus and the 101st Airborne, Atkinson also wrote In the Company of Soldiers: A Chronicle of Combat, which The New York Times Book Review called "intimate, vivid, and well-informed", and which Newsweek cited as one of the ten best books of 2004. Atkinson was the lead essayist in Where Valor Rests: Arlington National Cemetery, published by the National Geographic Society in 2007. He is the editor and introductory essayist for an anthology of work by the journalist and military historian Cornelius Ryan published by Library of America in May 2019.

In May 2019, the first book in the Revolution Trilogy, The British Are Coming: The War for America, Lexington to Princeton, 1775–1777, was published by Henry Holt and edited, as all of Atkinson's books have been, by John Sterling. The New York Times selected The British Are Coming for its 100 Notable Books of 2019. It won the 2020 George Washington Book Prize.

Awards and honors
 1982 Pulitzer Prize, National Reporting
 1983 Livingston Award for Young Journalists
 1989 George Polk Award for National Reporting
 1989 John Hancock Award for Excellence in Business Writing, with David Maraniss
 1989 Morton Mintz Award for Investigative Reporting
 1999 Pulitzer Prize for public service, awarded to The Post for articles on shootings by the District of Columbia police department
 2003 Pulitzer Prize in History, An Army at Dawn
 2003 Society for Military History Distinguished Book Award
 2007 Gerald R. Ford Award for Distinguished Reporting on National Defense
 2008 American Academy of Achievement's Golden Plate Award
 2009 Axel Springer Prize and fellowship, the American Academy, Berlin
 2009 John Reagan "Tex" McCrary Award, Congressional Medal of Honor Society
 2010 Pritzker Military Library Literature Award for Lifetime Achievement in Military Writing
2013 Norwich University, Honorary Doctor of Military History
 2013 New York Military Affairs Symposium, lifetime achievement award
 2014 Samuel Eliot Morison Prize for lifetime achievement, Society for Military History
 2014 Society of Midland Authors, best adult nonfiction book of the year
 2015 Peggy V. Helmerich Distinguished Author Award
 2019 Vincent J. Dooley Distinguished Fellow, honor bestowed by the Georgia Historical Society
 2020 George Washington Book Prize The British Are Coming, for the year's best work on the American founding era
2020 New-York Historical Society Barbara and David Zalaznick Prize in American History, The British Are Coming, for the year's best work in American history of biography
2020 Daughters of the American Revolution Excellence in American History Book Award for 2020, The British Are Coming
2020 Fraunces Tavern Museum Book Award, The British Are Coming

Bibliography

Books 
 
 
  (The Liberation Trilogy Vol. 1) (2003 Pulitzer Prize for History)
 
  (The Liberation Trilogy Vol. 2)
 
  (The Liberation Trilogy Vol. 3)
  (The Revolution Trilogy Vol. 1)

Young Readers Adaptations 

 (The Young Readers Adaptation of The Guns of Last Light)
  (The Young Readers Adaptation of The Guns at Last Light)
 The British Are Coming (Young Readers Edition). New York: Henry Holt Books for Young Readers. 2022. ISBN 9781250800589.

References

External links

Website for The Revolution Trilogy
Website for The Liberation Trilogy
Rick Atkinson interview on Counterpoint Radio with Marcus W. Orr Center for the Humanities at the University of Memphis.
Pulitzer Biography in 2003
Reviews of An Army At Dawn and The Day of Battle (Advanced Readers Copy)
Interview on In the Company of Soldiers on March 17, 2004, at the Pritzker Military Museum & Library
Interview on The Day of Battle on October 18, 2007 at the Pritzker Military Museum & Library
Presentation by Rick Atkinson on April 28, 2011 at the Pritzker Military Museum & Library
 Interview with Max Hastings at the Pritzker Military Museum & Library
 Lecture on Guns at Last Light on May 16, 2013 at Pritzker Military Museum & Library

Booknotes interview with Atkinson on Army at Dawn, November 17, 2002
In Depth interview with Atkinson, June 2, 2013

1952 births
Living people
American military writers
East Carolina University alumni
Pulitzer Prize for History winners
Pulitzer Prize for National Reporting winners
American male journalists
Berlin Prize recipients
Kansas City Times people
The Washington Post people
University of Chicago alumni